The Beechcraft Model 38P Lightning was an experimental turboprop aircraft built and tested by Beechcraft (now a division of Hawker Beechcraft) in the 1980s.

History 
The Model 38P (Pressurized) (also known as the model PD.336) was created by installing a Garrett AiResearch TPE-331-9 engine in the nose of a Beechcraft Baron 58P fuselage, which was mated to a Beechcraft B36TC Bonanza wing in place of the Baron's wing with two engines. This resulted in a low-wing aircraft with six seats including the pilot's. The aircraft flew for the first time on June 14, 1982. After 133 flights over almost 18 months the aircraft was temporarily grounded so that the TPE331 could be removed and a Pratt & Whitney Canada PT6A-40 engine fitted in its place. The aircraft flew in this configuration for the first time on March 9, 1984 and the last flight was on August 8 the same year. Beechcraft originally planned to put the Lightning into production but the economic downturn among general aviation manufacturers in the United States in the 1980s led to the project being shelved shortly after the first flight with PT6A power. Several Model 38Ps were pre sold to customers by the Beechcraft dealer network, but the purchase deposits collected were returned when the decision was made not to produce the aircraft.

Specifications (Model 38 P, PT6A engine, performance estimated)

See also

References 

Taylor, Michael J.H. (ed). Jane's Aviation Review: 1983–84. London: Jane's Publishing Company, 1983. .

1980s United States civil utility aircraft
Low-wing aircraft
Lightning
Single-engined tractor aircraft
Single-engined turboprop aircraft
Cancelled aircraft projects
Aircraft first flown in 1982